Rikke is a name, notable people with this name are:
 Rikke Broen (born 1972), Danish badminton player
 Rikke Dybdahl (born 1997), Danish football player
 Rikke Emma Niebuhr, Danish singer
 Rikke Granlund (born 1989), Norwegian handball player
 Rikke Helms (born 1948), Danish cultural worker
 Rikke Hørlykke (born 1976), Danish handball player
 Rikke Hvilshøj (born 1970), Danish politician
 Rikke Iversen (curler) (born 1998) Norwegian wheelchair curler
 Rikke Møller Pedersen (born 1989), Danish swimmer
 Rikke Olsen (born 1975), Danish badminton player
 Rikke Schubart (born 1966), Danish author & scholar
 Rikke Sevecke (born 1996), Danish football player
 Rikke Skov (born 1980), Danish handball player
 Rikke Søby Hansen (born 1995), Danish badminton player

See also 
Rikken
Rikki (name)

Danish feminine given names